The Northern Wet Tropics shadeskink or Cooktown shadeskink (Saproscincus lewisi) is a species of skink found in Queensland in Australia.

References

Saproscincus
Reptiles described in 1998
Skinks of Australia
Endemic fauna of Australia
Taxa named by Patrick J. Couper
Taxa named by Lauren D. Keim